"The Road You Leave Behind" is a song written and recorded by American country music artist David Lee Murphy.  It was released in July 1996 as the second single from his album Gettin' Out the Good Stuff.  The song peaked at number 5 on the U.S. Billboard Hot Country Singles & Tracks chart and number 12 on the Canadian RPM Country Tracks chart.

Content
Murphy described the song as "a real good kind of 'do the right thing' song," saying that its subject matter made it different from the content of his first album.

Critical reception
Larry Flick, of Billboard magazine reviewed the song favorably calling it "one of those philosophical life-lesson kinds of songs, but Murphy's vocal honesty keeps it from sounding preachy or schmaltzy."

Music video
The music video was directed by Michael Salomon and made its debut on Country Music Television on August 8, 1996.

Chart positions
"The Road You Leave Behind" debuted at number 62 on the U.S. Billboard Hot Country Singles & Tracks for the week of August 3, 1996.

Year-end charts

References

1996 singles
1996 songs
David Lee Murphy songs
Songs written by David Lee Murphy
Song recordings produced by Tony Brown (record producer)
MCA Records singles
Music videos directed by Michael Salomon